Srur is a surname. Notable people with the surname include:

 Idan Srur (born 1986), Israeli footballer 
 Marcelo Srur (born 1957), admiral in the Argentine Navy